Lamar Campbell (born February 13, 1964, as Millard Lamar Campbell II) is an American gospel musician. He started his music career in 1987, and has since created the group Spirit of Praise that are based out of Indianapolis, Indiana. They have released nine albums with six of them charting on the Billboard magazine Gospel Albums chart. He has released albums with a few labels, such as the following: Tyscot, EMI Gospel, Alliant, NuSpring, Soul Stride

Early life
Campbell was born Millard Lamar Campbell, on February 13, 1964, in Indianapolis, Indiana. His parents reared him in the Haughville Seventh Day Adventist Church, where he played the piano for the church choir at an early age. He is a graduate of Broad Ripple High School, and went on to study music at Butler University. Campbell became a minister of music in 1987 and formed his first group called Lamar Campbell & Praise. In 1992, the group disbanded as Campbell felt he was becoming arrogant due to its success, and wanted to spend time focusing on God's work instead. In 1995, he composed Lamar Campbell & Spirit of Praise, while he was at Light of the World Church, as their music minister.

Music career
His music career began in 1987, with the release of Ready by Tyscot Records on April 16, 1989, yet this did not chart. After the group disbanded and Spirits of Praise were formed in 1995, Campbell's success in the music industry started to improve. The self-titled album, Lamar Campbell & Spirit of Praise, was released on May 19, 1998, by EMI Gospel. This was his breakthrough release on the Billboard magazine Gospel Albums chart, which he would get five more albums to chart on that particular chart. He has released albums with five labels, Tyscot Records, EMI Gospel, Alliant Records, NuSpring Records, and Soul Stride Records.

Discography

References

External links
 Official website 
 Lamar Campbell Cross Rhythms Artist Profile

1964 births
Living people
African-American songwriters
African-American Christians
Musicians from Indianapolis
Songwriters from Indiana
Butler University alumni
21st-century African-American people
20th-century African-American people